The Kilwa Chronicle is a text, believed to be based on oral tradition, which describes the origins of the Swahili city-state of Kilwa, on an Indian Ocean island near the East African coast.  It recounts the genealogy of the rulers of the Kilwa Sultanate.

  The genealogical account is similar in both versions but other details vary substantially.

Sources 

 João de Barros (1552) , Dec. I, Lib. 8, Cap. 6 (p. 223ff)
 Strong, S. Arthur (1895) "The History of Kilwa, edited from an Arabic MS", Journal of the Royal Asiatic Society, January (No volume number), pp. 385–431. online

References

African chronicles
History of Tanzania
2nd-millennium books
History books about Africa
Lists of African monarchs